The 1995 NCAA Women's Gymnastics championship involved 12 schools competing for the national championship of women's NCAA Division I gymnastics.  It was the fourteenth NCAA gymnastics national championship and the defending NCAA Team Champion for 1994 was Utah.  The Competition took place in Athens, Georgia, hosted by the University of Georgia in the Georgia Coliseum. The 1995 Championship was won by Utah Red Rocks and was their 9th NCAA Title.

Team results

Session 1

Session 2

Super Six

External links
  Gym Results

NCAA Women's Gymnastics championship
NCAA Women's Gymnastics Championship